France will compete at the 2022 European Championships in Munich from August 11 to August 21, 2022.

Medallists

Competitors
The following is the list of number of competitors in the Championships:

Athletics

Beach Volleyball

France has qualified 1 male and 2 female pairs.

Cycling

Road

Men

Women

Gymnastics

France has entered 5 men and 5 women.

Men

Qualification

Women

Qualification

Rowing

Men

Women

Mixed

Sport climbing

Boulder

Combined

Lead

Speed

Triathlon

Men

Women

Mixed

References

2022
Nations at the 2022 European Championships
European Championships